"Dream Girl" is a song recorded by Canadian country artist Eric Ethridge. The track was co-written by Dan Smyers and Shay Mooney of Dan + Shay, with Jennifer Schott and Will Weatherly. The song was the lead single off Ethridge's debut studio album Good with Me.

Background
"Dream Girl" was Ethridge's debut US single, and premiered exclusively on Taste of Country. Ethridge told them: 

He told Sounds Like Nashville:

Critical reception
Cillea Houghton of Taste of Country said the track "instantly hits you with a summery feeling and shimmering pop country beat. It's the kind of beat that just beckons crowds to sing along during a live show" and that Dan + Shay's "handprints are all over the song, as evidenced by the earworm melody and clever wordplay". Thomas Burns Scully of Popdust said the song "plays exceptionally well with the pop country toolkit".

Drew Pearce of Sounds Like Nashville said "The song is a sleek piece of country-pop, complete with finger-snapping verses and smooth harmonies that build up to a soaring, anthemic chorus". Country Music Tattle Tale said Ethridge's "smooth vocals perfectly enhance the messaging of a love lost".

Music video
The music video for "Dream Girl" was directed by Quinton Cook, and premiered on April 25, 2020. It features Ethridge as well as several dogs, including a dog who was rescued from the Nashville tornado in 2020.

Track listings
Digital download - single
 "Dream Girl" – 3:11

Digital download - single
 "Dream Girl" – 3:11
 "Gasoline" – 2:49

Chart performance
"Dream Girl" reached a peak of #38 on the Billboard Canada Country chart dated May 9, 2020.

References

2020 songs
2020 singles
Eric Ethridge songs
Songs written by Dan Smyers
Songs written by Shay Mooney
Anthem Records singles